Gilbert Farquhar Davidson (1871-1930) was a Canadian Anglican priest in the 20th century.

Davidson was  educated at Trinity College, Toronto and ordained in 1895. After a curacy at St Anne, Toronto, he was a lecturer at Trinity from 1898 to 1907 and was Vicar of Guelph from 1907 until 1917. He was  Archdeacon of Wellington, ON from 1917 to 1925.

References

Archdeacons of Wellington, ON
Trinity College (Canada) alumni
20th-century Canadian Anglican priests
1871 births
1930 deaths